Mathilde Skjærdalen Myhrvold (born 16 July 1998) is a Norwegian cross-country skier.

Career
She finished ninth in the individual sprint at the 2020 Nordic Junior World Ski Championships. She took her first World Cup podium in December 2021, in Lenzerheide Switzerland.

Cross-country skiing results
All results are sourced from the International Ski Federation (FIS).

Olympic Games

World Cup

Season standings

Individual podiums
 2 podiums – (2 )

References

External links
 
 
 
 
 
 

Norwegian female cross-country skiers
Tour de Ski skiers
1998 births
Living people
Sportspeople from Gjøvik
Olympic cross-country skiers of Norway
Cross-country skiers at the 2022 Winter Olympics